Colegio María Auxiliadora ("Mary Help of Christians") located in Carolina, Puerto Rico, is a co-educational catholic school that belongs to the school system of the Archdiocese of San Juan de Puerto Rico. This institution offers courses from pre-kindergarten to the twelfth grade.

History 

Colegio Maria Auxiliadora was founded in 1960 by the Order of Salesians Sisters. His first classrooms were adjacent to the San Fernando Carolina parish and in 1967 acquired is current land. The parish priests then were Ángel Fernández, and Monsignor Baudilio Merino. In 1979 the school became part of the Archdiocese of San Juan de Puerto Rico.

2020 Coronavirus Pandemic 
During the COVID-19 pandemic a parish priest was one of the first to test positive for the virus forcing a quarantine of the school.

Mission 

The goal of Colegio Maria Auxiliadora is to educate and evangelize, and to achieve the full development of the student in all aspects: intellectual, spiritual, physical and moral.

Philosophy 

Considers the child as a unique being and individual whose value and dignity are guaranteed by a vision Christ-centric and believes that the educational process must provide to the students the tools for an authentic and healthy Christian growth and moral, intellectual, emotional, physical and social family.

Clubs  
National Honor Society
Students Council
Math Club
Library Club
Technology Club
Environmental Club

Sports 

 Basketball
 Baseball
 Table Tennis
 Volleyball
 Softball
 Soccer
 Track and field

Notable alumni 

 Dorimar Morales, winner of more than 70 awards for her academic research.
 Ivan Dariel Ortiz, creator of the film Héroes de Otra Patria
 Tito Ortos Guitérrez, famous international dancer .
 Pedro Cabiya, writer.

References

External links 
 
 Colegio Maria Auxiliadora official website

1960 establishments in Puerto Rico
Elementary schools in Puerto Rico
Carolina, Puerto Rico
Catholic secondary schools in Puerto Rico